A zémidjan (or zem) is a type of taxi found in Benin.  The highest concentration is found in the largest city, Cotonou, where there are an estimated 72,000. Zémidjans are motorcycles that carry one to two passengers for short distances in towns. The fares are entirely negotiable. The drivers wear uniforms that are color-coded by city and have registration numbers on the back. The name derives from the Fon language where zémidjan means "get me there fast" or "take me quickly". 

The way to call a zémidjan is "", a word derived from the Fon language. 'Keke' means motorcycle and 'no' means the 'owner of':  thus literally means 'owner of motorcycle'. The zémidjan typically stops by and the passenger and driver negotiate the price, depending on the final destination. The minimum rate is 100FCFA.

See also
 Taxicab
Motorcycle taxi

References

Taxis
Transport in Benin